Lenomyrmex is a Neotropical genus of ant in the subfamily Myrmicinae.

Species
 Lenomyrmex colwelli Longino, 2006
 Lenomyrmex costatus Fernández & Palacio, 1999
 Lenomyrmex foveolatus Fernández & Palacio, 1999
 Lenomyrmex hoelldobleri 
 Lenomyrmex inusitatus (Fernández, 2001)
 Lenomyrmex mandibularis Fernández & Palacio, 1999
 Lenomyrmex wardi Fernández & Palacio, 1999

Distribution
Lenomyrmex includes six rarely collected species from Costa Rica to Ecuador. Species have been collected from elevations close to sea level to 1800 m but seem to be mainly restricted to mid-elevations, that is, 1100–1500 m.

Description
The genus is characterized by elongate mandibles bearing a series of minute peg-like denticles that arise behind the masticatory margin, by frontal lobes that are poorly expanded laterally, by large and deep antennal fossae, and by pedunculate petiole, with a poorly defined node. Among Lenomyrmex species, the queen caste has been described only for L. mandibularis, L. wardi and L. inusitatus.

Taxonomy
The fact that Lenomyrmex possesses both primitive (e.g., promesonotal suture well developed) and derived (e.g., specialized morphology of the mandibles) characters makes ascertaining its correct phylogenetic position challenging. The genus was tentatively placed in its own tribe, Lenomyrmecini, but its position within the Myrmicinae remained to be determined. Preliminary results of a phylogenetic analysis indicated that Lenomyrmex fell within a clade of predominantly New World ants that includes the tribes Attini, Cephalotini, Dacetini, and the genus Pheidole. The genus was finally placed in Attini, when Ward et al. (2014) synonymized Lenomyrmecini under Attini.

Biology
The unusual morphology of the mandibles suggests that Lenomyrmex is a specialist predator on an unknown prey. This habit is possibly linked to its apparent rarity and restricted elevational distribution. The degree of queen-worker dimorphism is weak, suggesting small colony sizes and absence of claustral independent colony foundation. In a study, a thorough inspection of the dead wood lying on the ground and of soil samples failed to uncover any nest of L. inusitatus. This and the fact that both workers and dealate queens have been extracted from the leaf litter (Winkler method) may indicate that this species nests and forages in the leaf litter.

References

External links

Myrmicinae
Ant genera
Hymenoptera of South America
Hymenoptera of North America